The Iglesia San Isidro Labrador y Santa María de la Cabeza is a Spanish Colonial style building in Sabana Grande, Puerto Rico, which was built by 1844. The Bishop of Ponce saw to reconstruction in 1934.

It is one of 31 churches reviewed for listing on the National Register in 1984.

See also
 National Register of Historic Places in Sabana Grande, Puerto Rico

References

External links
 
 

Churches on the National Register of Historic Places in Puerto Rico
Sabana Grande, Puerto Rico
Roman Catholic churches completed in 1844
19th-century Roman Catholic church buildings in the United States
Neoclassical architecture in Puerto Rico
Spanish Colonial architecture in Puerto Rico
1844 establishments in Puerto Rico
Neoclassical church buildings in the United States